The Later Gupta dynasty ruled the Magadha region in eastern India between the 6th and 8th centuries CE. The Later Guptas succeeded the Imperial Guptas as the rulers of Magadha, but there is no evidence connecting the two dynasties; these appear to be two distinct families. The "Later Guptas" are so-called because the names of their rulers ended with the suffix "-gupta" (Late Brahmi:  gu-pta, as appearing in the Aphsad inscription of Ādityasena), which they might have adopted to portray themselves as the successors of the imperial Guptas.

History 

After the decline of the Gupta Empire, the Later Guptas succeeded them as the rulers of Magadha. The daughter of the dynasty's founder Krishnagupta is said to have married prince Adityavarman of the Maukhari dynasty. According to the Aphsad inscription of Ādityasena, Krishnagupta's grandson Jivitagupta carried out military expeditions in the Himalayan region and southwestern Bengal.

During the reign of Jivitagupta's son Kumaragupta, the dynasty developed a rivalry with the Maukharis. Kumaragupta defeated the Maukhari king Ishanavarman in 554 CE, and died at Prayaga. His son Damodaragupta suffered reverses against the Maukharis. 

Damodaragupta's son Mahasenagupta allied with the Pushyabhuti dynasty. His sister married the ruler Adityavardhana. He invaded Kamarupa and defeated Susthita Varman. But he subsequently faced three invaders: the Maukhari king Sharvavarman, the Kamarupa king Supratishthita-varman, and the Tibetan king Songtsen. His vassal Shashanka also abandoned him (and later established the independent Gauda Kingdom). The Maukhari king Sharvavarman is thought to have defeated Damodaragupta, invading Magadha circa 575 CE, which made him ruler of the entire Uttar Pradesh. Under these circumstances, Mahasenagupta was forced to flee Magadha, and take shelter in Malwa. Subsequently, the Pushyabhuti emperor Harsha (ruled c.606–647 CE) restored the Later Gupta rule in Magadha, and they ruled as Harsha's vassals.

After Harsha's death, the Later Gupta ruler Adityasena became the sovereign ruler of a large kingdom extending from the Ganges in the north to the Chhota Nagpur in the south; and from Gomati River in the east to the Bay of Bengal in the west. However, he was defeated by the Chalukyas.

Jivitagupta II, the last known ruler of the dynasty, appears to have been defeated by Yashovarman of the Varman dynasty of Kannauj circa 750 CE.

Rulers 

The known Later Gupta rulers include:

 Nrpa Shri Krishna-gupta (Kṛṣṇagupta), r. c. 490-505 CE
 Deva Shri Harsha-gupta (Harṣagupta), r. c. 505-525 CE
 Shri Jivita-gupta I, r. c. 525-550 CE
 Shri Kumara-gupta, r. c. 550-560 CE
 Shri Damodara-gupta, r. c. 560-562 CE
 Shri Mahasena-gupta, r. c. 562-601 CE
 Shri Madhava-gupta, r. c. 601-655 CE (Queen: Shrimati)
 Maharajadhiraja Aditya-sena, r. c. 655-680 CE (Queen: Konadevi)
 Maharajadhiraja Deva-gupta, r. c. 680-700 CE (Queen: Kamaladevi)
 Maharajadhiraja Vishnu-gupta (Viṣnugupta) (Queen: Ijjadevi)
 Maharajadhiraja Jivita-gupta II

Guptas of Jayapura 
A small kingdom that ruled the area around Lakhisarai district during the 11th and 12th centuries bore the name Gupta and have subsequently been linked as a surviving line of the Later Gupta.
Evidence of their rule comes from the Panchob copper-plate inscription which was discovered in 1919.

References

Bibliography 

 
 
 
 
 

Dynasties of India
Kingdoms of Bihar
States and territories established in the 6th century
States and territories disestablished in the 8th century
Ancient empires and kingdoms of India